Great British Railways (GBR) is a planned state-owned public body that will oversee rail transport in Great Britain, with the exception of Transport for London and Merseytravel services, and light rail and trams elsewhere in England. It will replace Network Rail as the operator of rail infrastructure across all of Great Britain (excluding some Valley Lines in Wales and some Merseyrail lines). It will also control the contracting of passenger train services, the setting of fares and timetables, and the collection of fare revenue, with the exception of services wholly within Scotland and Wales.

The concession contract system will be the long-term replacement for the previous system of passenger rail franchising run by the Department for Transport, which became unsustainable early in 2020 during the COVID-19 pandemic. GBR will be modelled on the operations of Transport for London, which contracts services on systems such as London Overground.

GBR is currently running a competition to find a town or city outside London to host its headquarters.

The Transport Secretary announced on 19 October 2022 that the Transport Bill which would have set up GBR would not go ahead in the current parliamentary session.

History
Great Britain's railway system was built by private companies, but it was nationalised by the Transport Act 1947 and was run from then onwards by British Railways (which traded as British Rail from 1965) until privatisation, which was begun in 1994 and completed in 1997. Infrastructure, passenger, and freight services were separated at that time. The infrastructure was privately owned and operated by Railtrack from 1994 to 2002, when it was renationalised and transferred to Network Rail. Goods (freight) services are operated by a number of companies, the descendants of those created during the 1990s privatisation.

During 2020, in the midst of the COVID-19 pandemic, all passenger train operating companies (TOCs) entered into Emergency Recovery Measures Agreements with the UK and Scottish Governments. Normal passenger service franchise mechanisms were amended, transferring almost all revenue and cost risk to the government, effectively 'renationalising' those services temporarily.

The new GBR organisation was proposed under the Williams–Shapps Rail Review, which was published as a white paper on 20 May 2021. The review had been launched in September 2018 and was led by Keith Williams.

A fortnight before the Williams–Shapps Plan for Rail was unveiled, the Department for Transport gave notice of a £6.5million contract for Deloitte up to February 2023 as its "strategic change delivery partner: rail reform programme".

Andrew Haines and Peter Hendy, the current CEO and chairman of Network Rail respectively, are overseeing the establishment of GBR.

Headquarters

The location for GBR's headquarters is currently being determined. The government has promised to base the organisation outside London to promote economic growth and skills in a region beyond the capital.

On 5 February 2022, the Department for Transport launched a public consultation for the location of GBR’s headquarters. By 16 March (the deadline for submitting expressions of interest), 42 towns and cities had expressed an interest in hosting GBR's headquarters.

Originally scheduled for May 2022, a shortlist consisting Birmingham, Crewe, Derby, Doncaster, Newcastle upon Tyne, and York was announced in July 2022, using the following criteria: alignment with "levelling up" objectives; connected and easy to get to; opportunities for GBR; railway heritage and links to the network; value for money; and public support. A public vote was held following the announcement.

The final decision was to be made later in 2022, but the result has not been announced as of February 2023.

Regions
GBR will be made up of five regional divisions, organised in line with Network Rail's Putting Passengers First programme. Budgets and delivery will be held at the local level as well as at the national level. Regional divisions will manage concession contracts, stations, infrastructure, and local and regional budgets, integrate track and train, and integrate rail with local transport services.

The five regions are:

 Scotland
 North West & Central
 Eastern (including the East Coast Main Line)
 Wales & Western
 Southern (including HS1)

Scope 
The reorganisation does not affect Northern Ireland, where the railway is already operated by the vertically integrated and already wholly state-owned Northern Ireland Railways. It does affect other devolved rail operators, including ScotRail, Transport for Wales, London Overground, Elizabeth line (Crossrail), and Merseyrail, as well as the combined authorities that oversee other local railway networks in England. The devolved administrations, the combined authorities, and the Greater London Authority will continue to exercise their current powers, such as setting fares and awarding contracts, and will remain democratically accountable for this. However, these bodies will be required to coordinate with GBR to deliver a single national rail network, including one website and app, as well as following national branding and passenger standards. GBR will own all infrastructure in Scotland and Wales that Network Rail owns now.

Stations
Under Network Rail, all stations are formally in public hands since 2014, but only 20 (mainly large termini and central stations) are managed directly by it. GBR will own all stations and most infrastructure in Great Britain. Existing leases of stations to devolved transport authorities will continue. Dedicated station management teams will be created within regional divisions of GBR to manage stations and land. GBR will develop masterplans for station renewal.

Branding

GBR will use a slightly modified British Rail Double Arrow and the Rail Alphabet 2 typeface for branding. The Williams–Shapps plan recommended that there will be a single, unifying brand for railways, and it is expected that this will be a gradual rebranding over time. English regions, Scotland, and Wales will have their own variants, but these will still emphasise the national nature of GBR. The white paper does not specify whether the branding of devolved railways such as London Overground and Merseyrail will be affected.

See also 

 History of rail transport in Great Britain 1995 to date
 Renationalisation of British Rail

References

External links
 for the Great British Railways Transition Team

Department for Transport
Government-owned companies of the United Kingdom
Non-departmental public bodies of the United Kingdom government

Railway infrastructure companies